Estadio Municipal Antonio Lorenzo Cuevas is a stadium in Marbella, Spain. It is primarily used for football. Spanish football team Marbella FC holding home matches at this stadium. The capacity of the stadium is 7,300 people. It is a venue for the Marbella Cup and Football Impact Cup, an annual friendly football tournaments.

Queen performed here on 5 August 1986 during their Magic Tour. This was their penultimate live show with Freddie Mercury. Exactly two years later, Michael Jackson performed in front of 28,000 during his Bad World Tour. In July 1990, Prince performed here on his Nude Tour.

External links
Estadios de España

References

Marbella
Buildings and structures in Marbella
Sports venues completed in 1975
Sport in Marbella